"Death Letter", also known as "Death Letter Blues", is the signature song of the Delta blues musician Son House. It is structured upon House's earlier recording "My Black Mama, Part 2" from 1930. House's 1965 performance was on a metal-bodied National resonator guitar using a copper slide. One commentator noted that it is "one of the most anguished and emotionally stunning laments in the Delta blues œuvre."

Lyrics 
Lyrically, the song is about a man who learns of the death of the woman he loves through a letter delivered to him early in the morning. The narrator later views her body on the cooling board at the morgue, attends her funeral and returns to his home in a state of depression.

House's lyrics draw from traditional sources. Other blues musicians recorded related songs, including Lead Belly ("Death Letter Blues"), Ishman Bracey ("Trouble Hearted Blues"), Ida Cox ("Death Letter Blues"), Robert Wilkins ("Nashville Stonewall") and Blind Willie McTell ("On the Cooling Board").

Folk revival performances 
"Death Letter" was the centerpiece of Son House's live performances during the blues revival of the 1960s.  House often altered the tempo and lyrics for different performances of "Death Letter", occasionally playing the song more than once during the same concert.

Renditions 
Skip James reworked the music and lyrics for his song "Special Rider Blues". Avant-garde blues artist Jandek added a verse from "Death Letter" to his song "I Went Outside". "Burying Ground" by Muddy Waters deals with the same subject. Captain Beefheart used an extensive reference in "Ah Feel Like Ahcid" on the album Strictly Personal.

"Death Letter" has been recorded by several popular musicians, including the Blues Band, Grateful Dead, John Mellencamp, Chris Thomas King, David Johansen, Tony McPhee, the Derek Trucks Band, the White Stripes, the Tallest Man on Earth and the Growl. The White Stripes performed part of the song live at the 2004 Grammy Awards. Canadian punk rock band Eamon McGrath & the Wild Dogs recorded the song in a hardcore punk style. Diamanda Galás, Cassandra Wilson, James Blood Ulmer, Gov't Mule, and Geoff Muldaur have also recorded the piece. The Cassandra Wilson cover, first included on her 1995 album New Moon Daughter, was selected as the theme song for the third season of the HBO anthology series True Detective airing in early 2019.

References

1965 songs
Blues songs
Song recordings produced by John Hammond (record producer)
Songs about death
Songs about letters (message)